Huff Creek is a stream in Nodaway County in the U.S. state of Missouri. It is a tributary of Nodaway River.

Huff Creek, historically called "Huff Branch", has the name of Joseph Huff, a pioneer citizen.

See also
List of rivers of Missouri

References

Rivers of Nodaway County, Missouri
Rivers of Missouri